Otto Rauhala (born 12 April 1995) is a Finnish professional ice hockey player. He is currently playing for Tappara of the Finnish Liiga. Rauhala's role is mostly being the stocky Harri Kirvesniemi-like bulldog.

Rauhala made his Liiga debut playing with Tappara during the 2013-14 Liiga season.

References

External links

1995 births
Living people
Tappara players
Lempäälän Kisa players
Finnish ice hockey forwards
People from Ylöjärvi
Sportspeople from Pirkanmaa